A Companion to Continental Philosophy is a 1998 book edited by Simon Critchley and William R. Schroeder with 58 essays on Continental philosophy.

References

External links 
 A Companion to Continental Philosophy

1998 non-fiction books
Continental philosophy literature
Edited volumes
Books in political philosophy